Izemmouren is a small town and rural commune in Al Hoceïma Province of the Taza-Al Hoceima-Taounate region of Morocco. At the time of the 2004 census, the commune had a total population of 4437 people living in 864 households.

References

Populated places in Al Hoceïma Province
Rural communes of Tanger-Tetouan-Al Hoceima